BMC Amazon is Multi Purpose armoured vehicle (MPAV) manufactured and designed by BMC to meet the requirements of the Turkish Land Forces. It first entered service with Turkey in January 2017. Amazon provides a significant protection against mine and ballistic threats. Its perfectly combined main and add-on armor provides a very good protection against ballistic threats while its V-shape and monocoque body allows it to protect the personnel inside from land mines and improvised explosive devices (IEDs).

BMC Amazon is a medium armored troop carrier and its primary objective is to transfer the personnel from one place to another while protecting them against all kind of threats. However, being a versatile land platform, it can receive different operational roles by being equipped with required mission equipment.

Description 
BMC Amazon has monocoque V-shaped body. Recovery and/or towing points are fitted front and rear, a NATO standard pintle being fitted at the rear. A front-mounted hydraulically operated self-recovery winch is standard.

V-shape monocoque body with composed add-on armor offers a good amount of resistant against mine and ballistic attacks in terms of NATO Stanag 4569. Protection levels are classified.

Cabin can carry 5 personnel in standard version, it can be increased to 7 optionally. driver, commander are sitting in front; gunner and two personnel are sitting at rear. Vehicle has 6 doors. 4 standard doors, a rear entry to the back (this area can be fit with two more additional seats) and roof hatch.Each personnel has mine protected seating, gun racks and gun ports to counter fire in times of need. There is a roof hatch, which opens up behind the weapon station, allowing to manually operate or reload. Rear door (5th door on the back) is air assisted. Other 5 doors including roof hatch has mechanic stop systems, preventing doors to close in slopes, preventing injuries.

BMC Amazon is 13.000 kg when empty, has 1.000 kg payload with a gross vehicle weight of 14.000 kg Motive power for the BMC Amazon is provided by a EURO 3 emissions compliant Cummins diesel engine developing 360 hp (275 kW). An engine cold start kit is fitted and the cooling system has been adapted for tactical applications in between 32 °C / +55 °C temperatures.

Driveline is completed by an Allison 3000 six-speed fully automatic transmission coupled to an Axletech two-speed transfer box with selectable 4x2 or 4x4 drive. A longitudinal driver-controlled pneumatically operated differential lock is fitted. Both the front steer-drive axle and the rear drive axles are Axletech rated at 7,000 kg capacity, has fully independent suspension with coil springs. Both axles are fitted with driver-controlled pneumatically operated cross-axle differential locks. Steering is power assisted.

Single 14.00 R 20 tyres are standard, rims are 10x20”. CTIS is fitted. Disc brakes are fitted front and rear, supplemented by an engine exhaust brake. ABS is also standard.

Automatic fire suppression system inside personnel cabin an engine departments are standard while outside and tire suppression systems are optional.

Variants

BMC Amazon MPAV is mainly used to transport troops. It is also a multi-purpose platform that can adapt the desired role, required by the end user. It can be utilized to serve different tactical purposes according to certain requirements.

Troop Carrier

Standard troop carrier version is used to transport troops from one place to another ignoring the climate and terrain hardships with utmost safety.  It can carry up to 7 personnel.

Combat Tactical Vehicle

Combat vehicle can carry up to 7 personnel while fighting enemies simultaneously.

Remote Controlled Vehicle

BMC Amazon MPAV can be equipped with remote controlled system. This system allows the vehicle to be operated manually where user sense there would be a trap. RCV can be commanded 1 km afar in-city conditions, 5 km afar in the open field. This system can also be equipped to another vehicle, which can follow the unmanned vehicle into risky areas.

Surveillance and Reconnaissance Vehicle

BMC Amazon MPAV can be utilized as a surveillance and reconnaissance vehicle by integrating relevant Turkish made mission equipment. The zoom cameras are installed on a telescopic mast that can be open up, up to 4m height. Cameras are capable of measuring up to 20 km on the weather conditions, that naked eye can see up to 10 km.

Defensive Laser Vehicle

Laser defensive systems can be integrated upon BMC Amazon MPAV thus turning vehicle to a cutting edge technology mobile defensive system.

Operators 
 20 in service.
 35 in service.

References 

Armoured vehicles
Military vehicles introduced in the 2010s
BMC (Turkey) vehicles
Military vehicles of Turkey